WWF Royal Rumble is a pinball machine designed by Tim Seckel and released by Data East in April 1994.

Overview
WWF Royal Rumble was designed as both a widebody machine as well as a narrow body. However, upon production, only a widebody machine was produced. The machine was designed a few years prior to release. The original backglass featured more than 18 different wrestlers but by the time the game was scheduled to go into production, many of the featured wrestlers had left the WWF. The backglass was revised and the production version backglass featured only six wrestlers. This is the first multi-level game released by Data East.

Game objectives
 Modes: Collect all 9 modes to begin the Rumble.  
 Multi-Ball: Collect all 9 wrestlers by shooting ramps and orbits.
 Jackpots: During Multi-Ball, collect lit Royal Rumble Jackpot in front of Ramps & Orbits. Collect all 9 wrestlers during multi-ball to light the Super Jackpot at the upper playfield.

References

External links
  
 https://www.ipdb.org/files/2820/WWF_Royal_Rumble.pdf

1994 pinball machines
Data East pinball machines
Professional wrestling games
Royal Rumble